Rič is a village in the municipality of Strumica, North Macedonia.

Demographics
According to the 2002 census, the village had a total of 382 inhabitants. Ethnic groups in the village include:

Macedonians 381
Serbs 1

References

Villages in Strumica Municipality